Highway 162 (AR 162, Ark. 162, and Hwy. 162) is a designation for two east–west state highways in Crawford County, Arkansas. One segment of  runs east from Highway 59 in Cedarville to Crawford County Road 25 (Hobbtown Rd) at Hobbtown. A second route of  begins at US 64/US 71B in Van Buren and runs east to Interstate 40/US 71/US 71B (I-40/US 71/US 71B) in Alma. Both routes are maintained by the Arkansas State Highway and Transportation Department (AHTD).

Route description

Cedarville to Hobbtown
Highway 162 begins at Highway 59 in Cedarville. The route heads east before ending and becoming Crawford CR 24/Hobbtown Road just after a bridge over East Cedar Creek.

Van Buren to Alma
The route begins at US 64/US 71B in Van Buren in the southeast portion of the city. The route runs due east, passing underneath I-540/US 71 with no interchange. It continues east through Kibler to Alma.

History
The segment between Van Buren and Alma was added to the state highway system between 1952 and 1953.
The segment between Cedarville and Hobbs was added to the state highway system on June 28, 1973.
The original Highway 162 was designated in 1937 from Highway 120 east of Luxora southward to the end of state maintenance. This highway was removed from the state highway system by 1939.
The second Highway 162 was designated between 1942 and 1945 from Highway 7 in El Dorado to US 167 (now Smith Avenue). This road was removed from the state highway system by 1951.

Major intersections

|-
| colspan= 5 align=center | Highway 162 begins in Van Buren

See also

 List of state highways in Arkansas

References

External links

162
Transportation in Crawford County, Arkansas
Fort Smith metropolitan area